Sergei Aleksandrovich Perednya (born 30 April 1972) is a Russian football coach and a former player. He is the manager of FC Khimik Dzerzhinsk.

Coaching career
On 3 April 2018, he was appointed manager of the Russian Premier League club FC SKA-Khabarovsk, with club in the last place in the league and 11 points behind the non-relegation spot with 6 games remaining.

References

1972 births
People from Nizhny Tagil
Living people
Russian footballers
Association football forwards
FC Ural Yekaterinburg players
FC Lokomotiv Nizhny Novgorod players
FC Tom Tomsk players
FC Sodovik Sterlitamak players
FC Volga Nizhny Novgorod players
Russian football managers
FC Volga Nizhny Novgorod managers
FC Tom Tomsk managers
Russian Premier League managers
Russian Premier League players
FC Luch Vladivostok managers
FC SKA-Khabarovsk managers
FC Uralets Nizhny Tagil players
FC Spartak Nizhny Novgorod players
Sportspeople from Sverdlovsk Oblast